Cathy Pill is a Belgian fashion designer, formerly creator and director of Cathy Pill label, and presently co-founder and chief executive officer of MuseStyle.

After graduating, Cathy quickly became a multi award-winning designer. She started her career at A.F. Vandevorst and Vivienne Westwood. The Cathy Pill label, famous for drapes and prints, was invited to show during Paris Fashion Weeks for 7 years,. The brand was featured in more than 70 stockists over the world (Galleries Lafayette, Browns, Harvey Nichols, Liberty, Stijl, Irina Kha and was worn by a number of celebrities (Lou Doillon, Beth Ditto, Eva Green). Cathy Pill also worked on a lot of collaborations. Amongst others, as a consultant for Fashion houses NATAN or as a guest designer for French catalogue retailer La Redoute's – (spring-summer 2011 edition)  with Lou Doillon as her egerie.
 
Around this period Cathy started gain interest in the digital world and all the opportunities it offers the Fashion Industry. After a one-year career interruption to focus on her family life (2011–2012), mentored by a community of web entrepreneurs, she decided to put her designer career on hold to develop her own start-up Musestyle.

Early life 
Born in Antwerp in 1981, Cathy Pill graduated from the fashion school E.N.S.A.V. of La Cambre in Brussels. She interned at brands such as A.F. Vandevorst and Vivienne Westwood before winning a numerous prizes.

Fashion Designer 

Cathy Pill was soon rewarded by the Fashion Industry as she successively wins an accolade of prices: The Collection of the Year at Trieste's contest. Its in 2005 the sponsorships of La Fondation Pierre Bergé et Yves Saint Laurent and of La Maison Yves Saint Laurent at the contest Andam in France; the Fabio Inghirami Award in Italy and the Modo Bruxelle Price in Belgium.

Pill launched her first ready-to-wear collection, titled "Blink", during the Spring/Summer 06 Paris Fashion Week. Exposed at Le Louvre, and marrying  Art Nouveau influenced sinuous patterns extraordinarily with draped and bunched silhouettes, the collection immediately evoked interest and attracted the international press, under which The Herald Tribune, Le Monde, Vogue or Style.com.

The following November, Cathy Pill was invited to present her collections during the Paris fashion weeks for 7 consecutive years.
After only a few collections, Cathy Pill's label could be found in more than 15 countries and 70 stockists Colette, Galleries Lafayette, Browns, Liberty.

In parallel, Cathy Pill worked as a consultant for other fashion houses (ex. NATAN, Claudia Strater. In 2008 Cathy Pill was chosen by Canon Europe to design the famous CD-dress as well as for the We Speak Image collection alongside Matthew Williamson and Jean Charles de Castelbajac.

During the Spring-Summer 2009 season, a line of printed leather bags was launched along with her collection, in collaboration with Kipling. In 2011, La Redoute invites Cathy Pill as their Guest Designer for the spring-summer 2011 edition with Lou Doillon as her egerie.

Co-founder and CEO Musestyle 
Founded by Cathy Pill, Musestyle.com is a fashion visual curation platform to be launched in December 2013. The bridges the gap between inspirational content and e-shopping allowing users to buy fashion and beauty products straight from images. Most importantly the site reunites a group of famous contributors coming from the Fashion Industry.

References

Living people
Belgian fashion designers
Belgian women fashion designers
1981 births